Nocardioides is a Gram-positive, mesophilic and aerobic bacterial genus from the family of Nocardioidaceae.

Species

 N. acrostichi Chen et al. 2021
 N. aestuarii Yi and Chun 2004
 N. agariphilus Dastager et al. 2008
 N. agrisoli Wang et al. 2017
 N. albertanoniae Alias-Villegas et al. 2013
 N. albidus Singh et al. 2016
 N. albus Prauser 1976 (Approved Lists 1980)
 N. alcanivorans Mitzscherling et al. 2022
 N. alkalitolerans Yoon et al. 2005
 N. allogilvus Zhang et al. 2018
 N. alpinus Zhang et al. 2012
 N. anomalus Park et al. 2020
 N. antarcticus Deng et al. 2015
 "N. antri" Lee et al. 2021
 N. aquaticus Lawson et al. 2000
 N. aquiterrae Yoon et al. 2004
 N. aromaticivorans Kubota et al. 2005
 "N. astragali" Xu et al. 2018
 N. baculatus Chhetri et al. 2021
 N. baekrokdamisoli Lee et al. 2016

 N. bigeumensis Dastager et al. 2008
 N. caeni Yoon et al. 2009
 "N. carbamazepini" Benedek et al. 2022
 N. caricicola Song et al. 2011
 N. cavernae Han et al. 2017
 N. cavernaquae Zhu et al. 2022
 N. convexus Park et al. 2020
 N. conyzicola Han et al. 2013
 N. coralli Shi et al. 2022
 N. currus Park et al. 2018
 N. cynanchi Suh et al. 2021
 N. daecheongensis Lim et al. 2014
 N. daedukensis Yoon et al. 2010
 N. daeguensis Cui et al. 2013
 N. daejeonensis Woo et al. 2012
 N. daphniae Tóth et al. 2008
 "Ca. N. delftensis" Rubio-Rincón et al. 2019
 N. deserti Tuo et al. 2015

 N. dilutus corrig. Dastager et al. 2009
 N. dokdonensis Park et al. 2008
 N. donggukensis Kim et al. 2021
 N. dongkuii Cheng et al. 2021
 N. dongxiaopingii Zhang et al. 2020
 N. dubius Yoon et al. 2005
 N. eburneiflavus Roh et al. 2020
 N. echinoideorum Lin et al. 2015
 N. endophyticus Han et al. 2013
 N. euryhalodurans Roh et al. 2020
 N. exalbidus Li et al. 2007

 N. ferulae Liu et al. 2019
 "N. flava" Singh and Yin 2016
 N. flavescens Zhang et al. 2020
 N. flavus Wang et al. 2016
 N. fonticola Chou et al. 2008
 N. furvisabuli Lee 2007
 N. ganghwensis Yi and Chun 2004
 N. gansuensis Wu et al. 2019
 N. gilvus Zhang et al. 2017
 N. ginkgobilobae Xu et al. 2016
 N. ginsengagri Lee et al. 2012
 N. ginsengisegetis Im et al. 2011
 N. ginsengisoli Cui et al. 2009
 N. glacieisoli Liu et al. 2015
 N. guangzhouensis Chen et al. 2020
 N. halotolerans Dastager et al. 2009
 N. hankookensis Yoon et al. 2008
 N. houyundeii Wang et al. 2018
 N. humi Kim et al. 2009
 N. humilatus Lee et al. 2022
 N. hungaricus Tóth et al. 2011
 N. hwasunensis Lee et al. 2008
 N. immobilis Lu et al. 2017
 N. insulae Yoon et al. 2007
 N. intraradicalis Huang et al. 2016
 N. iriomotensis Yamamura et al. 2011
 N. islandensis corrig. Dastager et al. 2009

 "N. jejuensis" Jang et al. 2020
 N. jensenii (Suzuki and Komagata 1983) Collins et al. 1989
 N. jishulii Dong et al. 2020
 N. kandeliae Liu et al. 2017
 N. kongjuensis Yoon et al. 2006
 N. koreensis Dastager et al. 2008
 N. kribbensis Yoon et al. 2005
 "N. lacusdianchii" Xiao et al. 2022
 N. lentus Yoon et al. 2006
 N. lianchengensis Zhang et al. 2012
 N. lijunqiniae Cheng et al. 2021
 N. litoris Lee et al. 2017
 N. litorisoli Wang et al. 2017
 N. luteus Prauser 1985
 N. luti Yoon et al. 2022
 N. malaquae Zhang et al. 2021
 N. mangrovi Chen et al. 2022
 N. maradonensis Lee et al. 2011
 N. marinisabuli Lee et al. 2007
 N. marinquilinus Cho et al. 2013
 N. marinus Choi et al. 2007
 N. massiliensis Dubourg et al. 2016
 N. mesophilus Dastager et al. 2010
 N. montaniterrae Srinivasan et al. 2015
 N. nanhaiensis Zhang et al. 2014
 N. nematodiphilus Zhang et al. 2022
 N. nitrophenolicus Yoon et al. 1999
 N. oleivorans Schippers et al. 2005
 N. opuntiae Lee and Seong 2014
 N. pacificus Fan et al. 2014
 N. pakistanensis Amin et al. 2016
 N. panacihumi An et al. 2007
 N. panacis Park et al. 2022
 N. panacisoli Cho et al. 2010
 N. panaciterrulae Kim et al. 2019

 N. panzhihuensis corrig. Qin et al. 2012
 "N. paucivorans" Ahn et al. 2014
 N. pelophilus Yan et al. 2018
 N. perillae Du et al. 2013
 N. phosphati Xie et al. 2017
 N. piscis Hyun et al. 2022
 N. plantarum Collins et al. 1994
 N. psychrotolerans Liu et al. 2013
 N. pyridinolyticus Yoon et al. 1997
 N. rotundus Wang et al. 2016
 N. rubriscoriae corrig. Lee and Lee 2014

 N. salarius Kim et al. 2008
 N. salsibiostraticola Cho et al. 2013
 N. sambongensis Hwang et al. 2020
 N. sediminis Dastager et al. 2009
 N. seonyuensis Roh et al. 2020
 N. silvaticus Li et al. 2019
 N. simplex (Jensen 1934) O'Donnell et al. 1983

 N. soli Sun et al. 2014
 N. solisilvae Sultanpuram et al. 2015
 N. sonneratiae Li et al. 2017
 N. speluncae Fang et al. 2019
 N. stalactiti Zhou et al. 2021
 "N. suum" Lee et al. 2017
 N. szechwanensis Liu et al. 2013
 N. taihuensis Qu et al. 2017
 N. terrae Zhang et al. 2009
 N. terrigena Yoon et al. 2007
 N. thalensis Khan et al. 2017
 N. tritolerans Dastager et al. 2009
 N. ultimimeridianus Lee et al. 2011
 N. ungokensis Zhao et al. 2015
 N. vastitatis Liu et al. 2020
 N. yefusunii Huang et al. 2019
 N. zeae Glaeser et al. 2014
 N. zeicaulis Kämpfer et al. 2016
 N. zhouii Zhang et al. 2019

References

Further reading 
 
 

 
Propionibacteriales
Bacteria genera